The Lecanorales are an order of mostly lichen-forming fungi belonging to the class Lecanoromycetes in the division Ascomycota. The order contains 26 families, 269 genera, and 5695 species.

Families
Suborder Lecanorineae 

 Biatorellaceae M. Choisy ex Hafellner & Casares-Porcel, 1992
 Brigantiaeaceae Hafellner & Bellem., 1982
 Bruceomycetaceae  Rikkinen & A.R.Schmidt in Rikkinen et al.,
 Byssolomataceae Zahlbr. 1926
 Carbonicolaceae Bendiksby & Timdal (2013)
 Catillariaceae Hafellner, 1984
 Cetradoniaceae J.C. Wei & Ahti 2002
 Cladoniaceae Zenker, J.C. 1827–1829

 Dactylosporaceae Bellem. & Hafellner, 1982
 Gypsoplacaceae Timdal, E. 1990
 Haematommataceae Hafellner, 1984
 Lecanoraceae Fée, A.L.A. 1824
 Malmideaceae Kalb, K., Rivas Plata, E., Lücking, R. & Lumbsch, H.T. 2011

 Pachyascaceae Poelt ex P.M.Kirk, P.F.Cannon & J.C.David, 2001
 Parmeliaceae Berchtold, F.v. & Presl, J.S. 1820
 Pilocarpaceae Zahlbr., 1905
 Porpidiaceae Hertel & Hafellner (1984)
 Psilolechiaceae S. Stenroos, Miądl. & Lutzoni, 2014
 Psoraceae Zahlbr., 1898
 Ramalinaceae C. Agardh, 1821
 Ramboldiaceae S. Stenroos, Miądl. & Lutzoni, 2014
 Scoliciosporaceae Hafellner, 1984
 Sphaerophoraceae Fée, A.L.A. 1824

 Tephromelataceae Hafellner, 1984
 Vezdaeaceae Poelt & Vezda ex J.C. David & D. Hawksw., 1991

incertae sedis of uncertain placement
Unplaced families;

Psilolechiaceae S. Stenroos, Miądl. & Lutzoni, 2014

There are several genera in the Lecanorales that have not been placed with certainty into any family. These are:

Coronoplectrum  – 1 sp.
Ivanpisutia  – 1 sp.
Joergensenia  – 1 sp.
Myochroidea  – 4 spp.
Neopsoromopsis  – 1 sp.
Notolecidea  – 1 sp.
Psoromella  – 1 sp.
Puttea  – 3 spp.
Ramalea  – 4 spp.

References

External links
Outline of Ascomycota - 2007
Class Lecanorales Plant Life Forms

 
Lichen orders
Lecanoromycetes orders
Taxa named by John Axel Nannfeldt
Taxa described in 1932